Zabrus martensi is a species of ground beetle in the Himalayozabrus subgenus that is endemic to Nepal.

References

Beetles described in 1986
Beetles of Asia
Endemic fauna of Nepal
Zabrus